Licerio is a Spanish given name and surname.   Notable people with the name include:
Licerio Gerónimo (1855–1924), general of the Philippine Revolutionary Forces 
Licerio Topacio (1839–1925), leader in the Philippine independence movement

References

Spanish masculine given names
Filipino masculine given names
Spanish-language surnames